Evan Michael Smotrycz (born August 2, 1991) is an American basketball player. He played college basketball for Michigan and Maryland. Engaged to Good Day Columbia WACH FOX 57 co-anchor Olivia DiVenti as of October 2022.

High school career
Smotrycz began his high school career with Reading Memorial High School in Massachusetts where he won the MVP award at a session of the Eastern Invitational Basketball Camp. He transferred to the New Hampton School and repeated his junior year to reclassify to the class of 2010. He averaged 14 points and 8 rebounds for a team that just missed out on making the playoffs. However, he began to receive heavy recruiting interest.

College career 
Smotrycz began his college career at Michigan. As a freshman, he posted 6.3 points per game, shooting 38 percent from behind the arc. On December 29, Michigan won its first Big Ten Conference opener since 2006–07, beating Penn State as Smotrycz extended his double-double streak to three games. As a sophomore, he averaged 7.7 points and 4.9 rebounds per game. After the season, he opted to transfer, citing the need for a better fit. Smotrycz ultimately chose Maryland over offers from Colorado and Providence because he felt comfortable with the coaches and players. Smotrcycz 9–11 (81.8%) career three-point shot percentage in the NCAA Tournament is a Michigan school record (min 10 attempts).

He averaged 11 points and six rebounds in 28 minutes a game as a junior. Coming into his senior season, Smotrycz dealt with a broken foot in the preseason, followed by a sprained knee and later sidelined with a hairline fracture of the thumb on his shooting hand. As a result, his numbers declined to 4.7 points and 4.1 rebounds in 19 minutes per game.

Professional career
After not being selected in the 2015 NBA Draft, he signed his first professional contract in July with Keravnos B.C. of the First Division of Cyprus. In his rookie season Smotrycz averaged 15.4 points, 7.2 rebounds and 2.3 assists per game. The following year he played in the NBA Summer League for the Toronto Raptors. On July 26, 2016, he signed with Eisbaren Bremerhaven of the Basketball Bundesliga, but after eleven games, an injury temporarily separated him from the team. In July 2017, Smotrycz inked with BG Göttingen. On February 20, 2018, after leaving Germany, he landed in Argentina where he replaced Dijon Thompson at the Club Ferro Carril Oeste. On November 2, 2018, Smotrycz was added to the Iowa Wolves opening night roster.

References

External links 
 Maryland Terrapins bio

1991 births
Living people
American expatriate basketball people in Argentina
American expatriate basketball people in Cyprus
American expatriate basketball people in Germany
American men's basketball players
Basketball players from Massachusetts
BG Göttingen players
Eisbären Bremerhaven players
Ferro Carril Oeste basketball players
Forwards (basketball)
Iowa Wolves players
Keravnos B.C. players
Maryland Terrapins men's basketball players
Michigan Wolverines men's basketball players
People from Reading, Massachusetts
People from Stoneham, Massachusetts
Sportspeople from Middlesex County, Massachusetts